Papilio jacksoni, the Jackson's swallowtail, is a butterfly of the family Papilionidae. It is found in Africa.

The female adults mimic Amauris echeria and relatives.

The larvae feed on Clausena, Toddalia and Clausena anisata.

Description

"Male as in ssp. echerioides, but black more sooty, median band narrower, reduced to very well separated spots in forewing,white with faint ochreous tinge. Female as in echerioides, but white apical spot does not touch the margin; white spots in hindwing in both sexes well inside margin." (Robert Herbert Carcasson, 1960).

Subspecies
Papilio jacksoni jacksoni (Kenya (highlands), eastern Uganda)
Papilio jacksoni ruandana Le Cerf, 1924 (Zaire, eastern Uganda, Rwanda, Burundi)
Papilio jacksoni hecqui Berger, 1954    (north-eastern Zaire)
Papilio jacksoni kungwe Cottrell, 1963 (western Tanzania)
Papilio jacksoni nyika Cottrell, 1963 (Nyika Plateau in northern Malawi and eastern Zambia)
Papilio jacksoni imatonga Clifton & Collins, 1997 (Imatong Mountains in south-western Sudan)

Taxonomy
Papilio jacksoni is a member of the echerioides species group. This clade includes:
Papilio echerioides Trimen, 1868
Papilio fuelleborni Karsch, 1900
Papilio jacksoni Sharpe, 1891
Papilio sjoestedti Aurivillius, 1908

Etymology
It was named for the collector Frederick John Jackson in "Descriptions of New Butterflies collected by Mr. F. J. Jackson, F.Z.S:, in British East Africa, during his recent Expedition. Part I & II" Proceedings of the Zoological Society of London 1891 : 187-194, pl. 16-17, : 633-638, pl. 48.

References

Carcasson, R.H., 1960 "The Swallowtail Butterflies of East Africa (Lepidoptera, Papilionidae)". Journal of the East Africa Natural History Society pdf Key to East Africa members of the species group, diagnostic and other notes and figures. (Permission to host granted by The East Africa Natural History Society).
Cottrell, C.B. (1963). Two new subspecies of Papilio jacksoni. E. Sharpe (Lepidoptera: Papilionidae) from Tanganyika and the northern Rhodesia-Nyasaland border. Proceedings of the Royal Entomological Society of London (B) 32: 125-128.

External links

Two New Subspecies of Papilio jacksoni E. Sharpe (Lepidoptera: Papilionidae) From Tanganyika and the Northern Rhodesia-Nyasaland Border

Butterflies described in 1891
jacksoni
Butterflies of Africa